Club Deportivo Binéfar is a Spanish football team based in Binéfar, in the autonomous community of Aragon. Founded in 1922 it plays in 3ª – Group 17, holding home matches at Campo de Deportes de los Olmos, with a capacity of 1,250 seats.

History 
In 1922, a group of friends having football as their hobby decided to create a club to give a more official character to their games.

In the 2018-19 season the club finished 11th in the Tercera División, Group 17.

Season to season

13 seasons in Segunda División B
50 seasons in Tercera División

Honours
Tercera División: 1980–81, 1981–82, 1987–88, 1996–97, 1997–98
Copa Federación de España: 1997–98

Selected former coaches
 David Rodrigo

References

External links
Official website 
Futbolme team profile 

 
Football clubs in Aragon
Association football clubs established in 1922
1922 establishments in Spain